The Rolls-Royce Dawn is a convertible luxury grand tourer manufactured by Rolls-Royce Motor Cars. It was announced at the 2015 Frankfurt Motor Show.

Overview 
The Rolls-Royce Dawn was built in order to replace the earlier 2-door open top car model, the Rolls-Royce Phantom Drophead Coupé.

The Dawn was built on the basis of the Rolls-Royce Ghost, unlike the earlier model which was based on the 7th Generation Rolls-Royce Phantom, the flagship car model of Rolls-Royce Motor Cars until the arrival of the 8th Generation and the Rolls-Royce Phantom Coupé.

The Rolls-Royce Dawn is the last open top combustion car made by Rolls-Royce Motor Cars. Wraith and Dawn are the only remaining Rolls-Royce vehicles using a BMW platform, so their demise was quite expected. It's confirmed that the Spectre replaces the Rolls-Royce Wraith Coupé and the Dawn Cabriolet.

Specifications and performance

Engine

Performance

Design

Interiors and exteriors

The front grille gets a design recess compared to the Wraith. The car has 20-inch polished wheels.

Body
Rolls-Royce has said that 80% of its body panels are new compared to the Wraith. To balance exclusivity and efficiency, Andreas Thurner designed the Rolls-Royce Dawn hand in hand with the Rolls-Royce Ghost Series II and the Rolls-Royce Wraith (Co-Designer Rolls-Royce Wraith)

Variants

Rolls-Royce Dawn Black Badge 

The Black Badge Dawn is a performance-oriented edition of the Dawn. Its exterior features are painted black (including the Spirit of Ecstasy) and has a new rim system. Its interior consists of carbon fibre applications and black coloured leather seats. The Black Badge marque has also been applied to the Rolls-Royce Cullinan and the Rolls-Royce Wraith.

Rolls-Royce Dawn Landspeed Edition 

Unveiled online alongside the Rolls-Royce Wraith Landspeed in June 2021, the Landspeed Edition is a limited version of the Dawn Black Badge made to pay homage to captain George E.T. Eyston.

The Interior bears new features such as the Eyston's OBE, Military Cross and Chevalier de la Légion and some features of the exterior are coloured yellow.

Rolls-Royce Dawn Silver Bullet 
The Rolls-Royce Dawn Silver Bullet is a special edition of the Rolls-Royce Dawn built on the basis of the roadsters of the 1920s.

The exterior and interior designs are inspired by classic open top cars and has a newly redesigned convertible roof that drops down in 22 seconds. The interior features new retro-styled applications.

The production is limited to only 50 cars worldwide.

Special editions by car tuners

Mansory Dawn

The Mansory Dawn is a car modified by the German car modification firm Mansory based on the Rolls-Royce Dawn.

The car features a new lower bodywork scheme and a new rim system. The car's interior has new leather applied seats and the interior has been customised using polished aluminium, carbon fibre, burl wood or highly polished piano lacquer surfaces.

See also
Rolls-Royce Ghost
Rolls-Royce Wraith
Rolls-Royce Motor Cars
Bentley Continental GT

References

External links
 
 
 First Drive Review

Dawn (2015)
Cars introduced in 2015
Luxury vehicles
Convertibles